Wat Phra That Lampang Luang is a Lanna-style Buddhist temple in Lampang in Lampang Province, Thailand.

Significance
The temple is said to enshrine a relic of the Buddha.  Such relics are typically bones and ashes believed to be gathered after the Buddha's cremation.  The relic is installed in the main chedi of the temple.

History

There are several bullet holes on the railing of the temple, reputed to be fired by legendary folk hero Nan Thipchang, and ancestors of the House of Chao Chet Ton (Seven Princes) which ruled Lanna as a Siamese Vassal during the Thonburi and Early-Mid Rattanokosin eras.

Image gallery

References 

Phra That Lampang Luang
Registered ancient monuments in Thailand